Brazil’s population exceeds 200 million people and is one of the largest countries in the world. Although considered a third world country, in 2022 Brazil ranked 10th on the List of countries by GDP (nominal), in front of Russia, Spain and Australia.

Brazilian economy had been extremely busy from 2010 to 2014 when it started to slow down after the 2014 FIFA World Cup which brought a lot of temporary investments to the country as well as cases of political corruption.

According to the World Bank, 81% of the country's population has access to the web, making it a huge 160 million people market segment.

With the outbreak of COVID19 around December of 2019, businesses around the world were forced to turn their marketing investments to the digital channels. In Brazil, big players like Mercado Livre and Hotmart surged as big online companies. Mercado Livre, an e-commerce platform similar to Ebay.com, was once valuated at $60 billion dollars, more than one of the Brazilian's largest industries, Vale S.A.

The Boston Consulting Group puts Brazil and other countries like it into a particular digital category: “Straight to Social media”. The country was long dominated by Google-owned network Orkut. However, Facebook and Instagram have dominated the social media space during the last decade with more than 100 million users.

Outside of the social media space, there was another segment that showed enormous development: the e-learning space, or Educational technology. Hotmart rapidly became one of the preferred platforms where users can upload and distribute any type of online course.

Success examples 
Brazil leads the Latin America region for e-commerce with retail sites reaching 70% of the online population, according to comScore. Among our smart pack case studies, these are analyses of three e-retail success stories:

Americanas.com and Submarino.com 
Both companies owned by B2W, these are two of the biggest online e-commerce companies in Brazil, both in sales and popularity. One of Brazil's most well-known stores, the primary online property for Lojas Americanas serves 3 million customers around 70,000 products. The retailer boasts an amazing social presence with more than 200,000 on Facebook and is utilizing a mobile commerce iPhone app to engage with customers whether they are at home or browsing in-store. Americanas.com announced in November 2006 its merger with Submarino, creating an absolute leading company in the online sales segment in Brazil. The new company, B2W, must compete with the traditional trade chains.

Mercado Livre 
With headquarters in Argentina, Mercado Livre gained notoriety as the preferred market place to sell anything online, where anyone can create an account and have their offer ready within minutes.

Hotmart.com 
Hotmart is one of the biggest tech companies in Brazil offering a complete solution for content creators who want to "package" and sell their content online.

Conclusion 
Leading businesses in Brazil are taking advantage of opportunities across social and mobile in Brazil. Exclusive data from IAB Brazil also signals that Internet advertising including search is growing strong. The digital landscape is fluctuating quickly. In comparison to markets where similar changes have been on-going for the past 10 years, one cannot help but notice that it seems like, for Brazil, everything happened quickly as confirmed by Brazilian digital marketing expert, Lucas Riccieri, who specializes in marketing management and digital planning. While highlighting the power of the e-learning segment, he emphasizes that the core principles of marketing haven't changed, we just now have new channels to reach our audiences.

References 

Digital marketing
Advertising in Brazil